A  (literally 'head of ten', also called caporegime in the American Mafia) is the head of a , a branch within a Sicilian Mafia family.

The term was mentioned as early as the 1880s in Sicily to describe the organisation of the Fratellanza, a Mafia-type organisation in Agrigento, in the south of Sicily.

He said a family split into groups of ten men each when it became unmanageably large.

References

Gambetta, Diego (1993).The Sicilian Mafia: The Business of Private Protection, London: Harvard University Press, 
Paoli, Letizia (2003). Mafia Brotherhoods: Organized Crime, Italian Style, New York: Oxford University Press  (Review)
Schneider, Jane T. & Peter T. Schneider (2003). Reversible Destiny: Mafia, Antimafia, and the Struggle for Palermo, Berkeley: University of California Press 

Organized crime members by role
Organized crime terminology